Wannee is an unincorporated community in Gilchrist County, Florida, United States.

Geography 

References 

Unincorporated communities in Gilchrist County, Florida
Unincorporated communities in Florida